Busse Woods is an album by the stoner metal band Acid King. The album was released in 1999 by Man's Ruin Records; it was reissued in 2004, with bonus tracks, by Small Stone Records, and on vinyl in 2007 by Kreation Records.

The album's title (pronounced buss-ee) is the local name for the Ned Brown Forest Preserve, which is located near Chicago. As a teenager, frontwoman Lori S. often met there with friends to hang out and take drugs.

The reissue of Busse Woods has slightly different artwork and two extra songs, cover versions of "Motorhead", by Hawkwind, and "Not Fragile", by Bachman-Turner Overdrive. The cover versions were released on the compilation albums Daze of the Underground and In the Groove, respectively. "39 Lashes" is also a cover song, originally appearing in Jesus Christ Superstar.

Busse Woods is the only Acid King album with bass guitarist Brian Hill.

Critical reception
The Austin Chronicle wrote that the album "may not be very inventive, but it sure is dark and heavy".

Track listing
(All songs written by Lori S. unless noted)
"Electric Machine" – 6:25
"Silent Circle" – 7:30
"Drive Fast, Take Chances" – 8:32
"39 Lashes" (Andrew Lloyd Webber; Tim Rice) – 6:24
"Carve the 5" – 9:27
"Busse Woods" – 7:36
"Motorhead" (Lemmy Kilmister) – 4:42*
"Not Fragile" (C.F. Turner) – 6:04*

*Reissue bonus tracks

Credits
Lori S. – vocals, guitar
Brian Hill – bass guitar
Joey Osbourne – drums
Billy Anderson – engineer
Design – Lori S. and Dept. 8
Additional art trickery – Andy Hunter, Scott Hamilton
Photography – Erica Roewade, W. Web

References

External links
Reviews of Busse Woods on Small Stone Records

Acid King albums
1999 albums
Man's Ruin Records albums